Javier de Rivera (born 1902) was a Spanish actor and film director. He appeared in over thirty films, including the 1926 silent Malvaloca. He directed two films in the 1940s.

Selected filmography
 Heart of Gold (1923)
 Malvaloca (1926)
 The Mendez Women (1927)
 El mejor tesoro (1966)
 Dick Turpin (1974)

References

Bibliography 
 Goble, Alan. The Complete Index to Literary Sources in Film. Walter de Gruyter, 1999.

External links 
 

1902 births
Year of death missing
Spanish film directors
Spanish male film actors
Spanish male silent film actors
People from Las Palmas